Nasser Pourpirar (born Nasser Banakonandeh,; pen name: Naria, Persian: ‎; 1940 or 1941 in Tehran – 27 August 2015 in Tehran) was a famous Iranian writer and historical revisionist. He was known for his controversial theories questioning the academically recognized historiography of Iran from Achaemenids to the beginning of the Safavid period.

Early life 

Pourpirar was born in 1940 or 1941 in Tehran, Iran. Pourpirar was closely involved with the Tudeh Party of Iran, a major Iranian political party with Communist or left tendencies. After the 1979 Revolution and after he embezzled the party's money then he joined the revolutionaries. On August 27, 2015 he died of Parkinson's disease at the age of 75.

Pourpirar's claims 

Pouripirar claimed that Purim (recorded in the Biblical Book of Esther) was a genocide against indigenous civilised Iranians committed by the Achaemenid Shah Darius I and his Jewish allies. He claims that "after the great genocide committed by Jews in Purim, the land of Iran was completely wiped out of human beings until the beginning of Islam."

He considered the Behistun Inscription as a symbol of this genocide. He claimed that construction of Persepolis was never finished and that the Achaemenid dynasty was a group of ancient barbarian Slavic invaders that ended with Darius the Great after they returned to their homeland in the Eurasian steppes. The rest of the Achaemenid, Parthian, Sassanid, Tahirid, Ghaznavid, Seljuqid and Samanid dynasties according to Pourpirar were fabricated by historians of mostly Jewish background as part of a Jewish conspiracy.

According to Pourpirar a few historic sites that are said to be Parthian are either clearly related to Greeks or are modern forgeries. He claimed that all inscriptions said to be Sassanid are modern forgeries. He claimed that historical personalities such as Mazdak, Mani, Zoroaster, Babak, Abu Muslim, and Salman the Persian were invented by modern Jewish historians.

Regarding the reliability of Iranian dynasties he wrote: "So everyone should know that the builders of the false historical and social lies of the last two thousand years between Purim till the Safavids were the Jews. They wanted to hide their genocide and thus used lies by fabricating history."

Bibliography 

A list of books written by Pourpirar expounding his view may be found in Karang Books, which is the publishing house he owns.

 The people will be victorious
 A thousand events will happen
 Foetus
 Colors Harmony, (eight volumes) with Feryal Dehdashti Shahrokh.
 Perhaps these five days
 Deliberation on structure of the Iranian history 
 Twelve centuries of Silence: Achaemenids
 Twelve centuries of Silence: Parthians
 Twelve centuries of Silence: Sassanids Part I
 Twelve centuries of Silence: Sassanids Part II
 Twelve centuries of Silence: Sassanids Part III
 A bridge to the past: Part I
 A bridge to the past: Part II
 A bridge to the past: Part III
 Address to the third congress of Tudeh party of Iran (seven volumes)

Responses 

The following books responded to Pourpirar's claims:

 The glorious Millenaries, by Dariush Ahmadi.  See also the book's weblog.
 Twelve centuries of splendor, by Amir Limayi and Dariush Ahmadi
 Cyrus and Babylon, by Houshang Sadeghi
 The Veracity of ancient Persian and Arya (by Mohammad Taqi 'Ataii and Ali Akbar Vahdati.
 The Glorious Millenaries: a website with collection of articles in response to Pourpirar

Opponents responses 
 Azargoshnasb, Response to Anti-Iranians

References

External links 
 Official weblog of Pourpirar
 Link to photo

1940s births
2015 deaths
Iranian male writers
20th-century Iranian historians
Iranian conspiracy theorists
Tudeh Party of Iran members
Antisemitism in Iran
Pseudohistorians
Neurological disease deaths in Iran
Deaths from Parkinson's disease